The Écossais River (English: Scottish River) is a tributary of the Yamaska River. It flows in the administrative region of Montérégie, on the South Shore of the Saint Lawrence River, in Quebec, Canada. Its course towards the north-east successively crosses the municipalities of:
 Sainte-Brigide-d'Iberville, MRC of Le Haut-Richelieu Regional County Municipality;
 Farnham, MRC of Brome-Missisquoi;
 Saint-Césaire in the Rouville Regional County Municipality (MRC).

Geography 

The main neighboring watersheds of the Écossais River are:
 North side and east side: Yamaska River;
 South side: rivière aux Brochets (Missisquoi Bay tributary), Missisquoi Bay;
 West side: rivière du Sud-Ouest (Yamaska River tributary), Richelieu River.

The "Écossais River" originates from various agricultural and forest streams in the western part of Sainte-Brigide-d'Iberville. This area is located north of the Canadian National railway, south of Autoroute 10, south of route 104 and west of Farnham.

From this head area, the Scottish River flows over:
  north in the agricultural zone in Farnham to route 233;
  north-east in an agricultural zone to Highway 10 that it crosses;
  towards the north-east in an agricultural zone to its mouth.

The mouth of the Scottish River empties into a small bay on the west bank of the Yamaska River. This bay also receives the waters of the Sud-Ouest River.

Toponymy 

Formerly, this watercourse was designated "Small Southwest River".

The toponym "Rivière des Écossais" was officially registered on August 17, 1978, in the Bank of place names of the Commission de toponymie du Québec.

See also 
 Yamaska River, a watercourse
 Rivière du Sud-Ouest, a watercourse
 Saint-Césaire, a municipality
 Sainte-Brigide-d'Iberville, a municipality
 Farnham, a municipality
 Rouville Regional County Municipality (MRC)
 Brome-Missisquoi Regional County Municipality (MRC)
 List of rivers of Quebec

References

External links 
 

Rivers of Montérégie
Rouville Regional County Municipality